Nabil Omran Abdul-Rahim (born 31 January 1981) is a Libyan futsal player.

Omran played for the Libya national futsal team at the 2008 FIFA Futsal World Cup.

Honors 

 African Futsal Championship:
 2008
 Arab Futsal Championship:
 2007, 2008

References

1981 births
Living people
Libyan men's futsal players